Joanne Parrott was elected as a member of Maryland House of Delegates, District 35A, which serves Harford County. She won one of two seats, along with Barry Glassman, defeating incumbent Michael G. Comeau and winning the seat left vacant by James M. Harkins, who was elected as Harford County Executive.  She served for about 8 years before being defeated in the Republican Primary by challenger Donna Stifler in 2006.

Education
Delegate Parrott graduated from Ephrata High School in Ephrata, Pennsylvania.  After high school she attended the Peabody Conservatory of Music and Gettysburg College in Pennsylvania.

Career
Parrot spent much of her early career in advertising.  She was a member of the Maryland Association of Counties from 1986–98, the United Way of Central Maryland from 1987–91, among others. She also served as an alternate delegate to the Republican Party National Convention in 1992. She was a member of the Harford County Council from 1986 - 1998 serving as President from 1994 - 1998.

She was the founder and President of Board of The Highlands School, Inc. She received the Outstanding Woman of the Year award from the Women's Club of Greater Fallston in 1984. She received the Virginia Scotten Award from the Harford County Republican Central Committee in 1987. Finally, she was an Honorary Chair, March of Dimes - Walk America, 1996-98. She was named one of Maryland's Top 100 Women by the Daily Record in 2003.

She died at her home in Fallston, Maryland and is survived by her two children.

Election results
2006 Primary Race for Maryland House of Delegates – District 35A
Voters to choose two:
{| class="wikitable"
|-
!Name
!Votes
!Percent
!Outcome
|- 
|Barry Glassman, Rep.
|5,290
|  38.6%
|   Won
|-
|Donna Stifler, Rep.
|4,639
|  33.9%
|   Won
|-
|Joanne S. Parrott, Rep.
|3,759
|  27.5%
|   Lost
|}

2002 Race for Maryland House of Delegates – District 35A
Voters to choose two:
{| class="wikitable"
|-
!Name
!Votes
!Percent
!Outcome
|- 
|Barry Glassman, Rep.
|22,463
|  49.2%
|   Won
|-
|Joanne S. Parrott, Rep.
|22,801
|  50.0%
|   Won
|-
|Other Write-Ins 
|387
|  0.9%
|   
|}

1998 Race for Maryland House of Delegates – District 35A
Voters to choose two:
{| class="wikitable"
|-
!Name
!Votes
!Percent
!Outcome
|- 
|Barry Glassman, Rep.
|17,998
|  32%
|   Won
|-
|Joanne S. Parrott, Rep.
|14,963
|  26%
|   Won
|-
|Michael G. Comeau, Dem.
|13,250
|  23%
|   Lost
|-
|Lee D. McDaniel, Dem.
|10,291
|  18%
|   Lost
|}

References and notes

External links
http://www.joanneparrott.com/
http://www.msa.md.gov/msa/mdmanual/06hse/former/html/msa02782.html

1940 births
2009 deaths
Republican Party members of the Maryland House of Delegates
People from Fallston, Maryland
People from Ephrata, Pennsylvania
Women state legislators in Maryland
20th-century American politicians
20th-century American women politicians
21st-century American politicians
21st-century American women politicians